The women's 5000 metres walk event at the 1990 World Junior Championships in Athletics was held in Plovdiv, Bulgaria, at Deveti Septemvri Stadium on 12 August.

Medalists

Results

Final
12 August

Participation
According to an unofficial count, 29 athletes from 21 countries participated in the event.

References

5000 metres walk
Racewalking at the World Athletics U20 Championships